Chicken claw may refer to:

 Chicken feet, a part of the chicken that is cooked in China, Indonesia, Korea, Japan, Laos, Singapore, Malaysia, Trinidad and Tobago, Ukraine, Russia, Romania, Moldova, Jamaica, South Africa, Peru, Mexico, Philippines and Vietnam
 Chicken sickles, a Chinese martial arts weapon
 "Chicken Claw", a song by That Handsome Devil
 The chicken claw, a variation of the Cartesian skyscraper
 Wrinkles in the outer corner of the eyes due to aging; these may resemble a chicken's claw

See also
 Crow foot (disambiguation)